Tomáš Mertl (born March 11, 1986) is a Czech professional ice hockey player currently with HC Plzeň of the Czech Extraliga. He originally played with HC České Budějovice in the Extraliga during the 2010–11 Czech Extraliga season before joining fellow ELH club, HK Hradec Kralove.

Career statistics

Regular season and playoffs

International

References

External links

1986 births
Living people
BK Mladá Boleslav players
Motor České Budějovice players
Czech ice hockey forwards
Sportspeople from České Budějovice
HC Kunlun Red Star players
Ice hockey players at the 2018 Winter Olympics
Olympic ice hockey players of the Czech Republic
KHL Medveščak Zagreb players
HC Plzeň players
Salavat Yulaev Ufa players
HC Tábor players
SK Horácká Slavia Třebíč players
Stadion Hradec Králové players
Czech expatriate ice hockey players in Russia
Czech expatriate ice hockey people
Expatriate ice hockey players in China
Expatriate ice hockey players in Croatia
Czech expatriate sportspeople in China
Czech expatriate sportspeople in Croatia